Heckscher–Ohlin can refer to:
 Heckscher–Ohlin model, a general equilibrium mathematical model of international trade
 Heckscher–Ohlin theorem, one of the four critical theorems of the Heckscher–Ohlin model